San Luis de la Paz, and its surrounding municipality of the same name, is a city located in the northeastern part of the state of Guanajuato in Mexico. San Luis de la Paz was founded on August 25, 1552, as a defensive town on the Spanish Silver Road, which linked the Zacatecas mines with Mexico City during the Spanish domination. It owes its name to the peace treaty between Otomi Indians, who were Spaniard allies, and the native Chichimecas, on the day of Saint Louis of France, August 25. San Luis de la Paz is also known as the Chichimeca Nation.

Population data 
The municipality lies adjacent to the southern border of the state of San Luis Potosi. The city serves as the seat of the municipality. At the Mexican census of 2009, the city had a population of 109,000 inhabitants. The municipality has an area of 2,030.14 km² (783.84 sq mi). Its largest other community is the town of Misión de Chichimecas.

Tourism 
San Luis de la Paz is surrounded by many mountains and rock formations, like the Bernalejo hill and the Bridge of God.

The Paso de Vaqueros Canyon is 30 minutes outside the town of San Luis de la Paz. The Manzanares and San Juan Rivers are inside the canyon. Paso de Vaqueros is sought for rappelling, bungee jumping, swimming, rock climbing and hiking.

Economy 
San Luis de la Paz is considered to be the most important agricultural and commercial area of the Sierra Gorda (northeast zone) in the state of Guanajuato. Furthermore, it is also considered an ideal location to set up manufacturing firms.

References

Sources
Link to tables of population data from Census of 2005 INEGI: Instituto Nacional de Estadística, Geografía e Informática
Guanajuato Enciclopedia de los Municipios de México

External links
https://web.archive.org/web/20070502153305/http://www.sanluisdelapaz.com/
http://www.guanajuatotimes.tv
http://www.guanajuatotimes.com

Populated places in Guanajuato
Municipalities of Guanajuato
Populated places established in 1552
1552 establishments in the Spanish Empire